Dubac may refer to:

Dubac, Montenegro
Dubac, a settlement in the Župa dubrovačka valley in Croatia